Fabio Mendouca Carvalho (born 28 July 1993) is a Swiss former professional footballer who played for FC Lausanne-Sport as a defender or midfielder.

Career
On 14 March 2015, Carvalho made his professional debut with Lausanne in a 2014–15 Swiss Challenge League match against FC Winterthur. He won the 2015–16 Swiss Challenge League with Lausanne-Sport.

He then played for FC Le Mont in the Swiss Challenge League in the 2016–17 season. After the club's relegation due to financial issues, he signed for FC Stade-Lausanne Ouchy in the Swiss Promotion League.

References

External links

1995 births
Living people
Swiss men's footballers
Association football defenders
Swiss Challenge League players
FC Lausanne-Sport players
Place of birth missing (living people)